Kazyonno-Kuzhorsky is a rural locality (a khutor) in Natyrbovskoye Rural Settlement of Koshekhablsky District, Adygea, Russia. The population of this khutor was 774 as of 2018. There are 9 streets.

Geography 
Kazyonno-Kuzhorsky is located 32 km south of Koshekhabl (the district's administrative centre) by road. Volnoye is the nearest rural locality.

References 

Rural localities in Koshekhablsky District